Vadim Akolzin (born October 19, 1982) is an Israeli former pair skater. He achieved his best ISU Championship result, tenth, at the 2005 European Championships with Julia Shapiro.

Personal life
Vadim Akolzin was born in Tver in 1982 and moved to Israel in 1999.

Career
Akolzin originally competed as a single skater for Israel. In 2002, he switched to pairs and began competing with Julia Shapiro. Shapiro/Akolzin were the 2003-2005 Israeli national pairs champions. Their partnership ended in 2005. 

In 2007, Akolzin teamed up with Hayley Anne Sacks. They placed second in their first competition together, the Israel national championship, and then placed 17th at the 2008 World Championships. They parted ways after repeating as national silver medalists at the 2008–09 Israeli Championships.

Programs

With Sacks

With Shapiro

Single skating

Competitive highlights

With Sacks

With Shapiro

Singles career

References

External links

 
 
 
 Pairs on Ice: Shapiro & Akolzin

1982 births
Living people
Sportspeople from Tver
Russian emigrants to Israel
Israeli male pair skaters
Israeli male single skaters
People from Metula